Leichosila talamanca is a moth of the subfamily Arctiinae first described by Christian Schmidt in 2009. It is found in Cordillera de Talamanca, Costa Rica.

The forewing length is 15–16 mm.

References

Arctiini